Silvio Calcagno (born 4 May 1969) is an Italian former bobsledder. He competed in the four man event at the 1994 Winter Olympics.

References

External links
 

1969 births
Living people
Italian male bobsledders
Olympic bobsledders of Italy
Bobsledders at the 1994 Winter Olympics
People from Savona
Sportspeople from the Province of Savona